"The Losing Edge" is the fifth episode in the ninth season of the American animated television series South Park, and the 130th episode of the series overall. It originally aired on Comedy Central in the United States on April 6, 2005.

In the episode, the boys try to lose their baseball games on purpose so they can play video games all summer, instead of dealing with baseball. Meanwhile, Randy trains to fight the other fathers at the games.

Plot
None of the boys playing for the South Park Cows, the town's Little League Baseball team, enjoy the sport at all. They find baseball boring and play only because of their parents' enthusiasm for the sport.

When they win their final game, they are at first overjoyed, believing the season is over and they have the rest of the summer to enjoy - only until they discover, to their horror, that since they finished first in their division, they will have to continue playing in the post-season playoffs. During a 'celebration' meal, the team discusses plans to lose on purpose while making it look like they are trying and if they get caught, they will be in big trouble.

However, South Park realize that the other teams also want out, and have actually trained to lose games.  The South Park Cows end up winning again and again against opponents whose efforts at throwing games are more successful, and they eventually get to the state championship game. To their horror, they realize that if they win, their season will start again on the national circuit, meaning they will have to play baseball for the whole summer.

Meanwhile, Stan's father Randy has taken up the hobby of being a "trash-talking dad", being generally obnoxious at every game so as to get into fights with other, equally obnoxious fathers. A running gag throughout the episode is that Randy yells, "I thought this was America!" while being arrested on multiple occasions for fighting. While training to be the best fighter he can be, Randy becomes terrified when he meets the Denver Little League team's "Bat Dad", who wears a purple Batman cowl and cape, is much bigger than him, and behaves even more obnoxiously. Randy decides not to attend the game in fear that he is not good enough.

Cartman tells the team that they need someone who "totally sucks ass" to join their team. Kyle says he knows just the person: his nerdy cousin Kyle Schwartz, who is terrible at all sports.

Stan and the others play their game at Coors Field against Denver, who, like the other opponents, do not want to win either. Even drafting Kyle's cousin fails, as the other team is the best yet at intentionally losing. Just as it seems the South Park team is sure to win, Randy shows up and begins a huge fight with Bat Dad that spills onto the field. Randy continues to fight as the boys cheer him on, leaving the officials to disqualify South Park, and the team celebrates. At first, Randy is upset that he got the boys disqualified, but Stan thanks him for getting them disqualified, which raises his confidence.

Production
The episode's idea originally came from series co-creators Trey Parker and Matt Stone thinking that the children of South Park would look cute in baseball uniforms. Parker and Stone also were not fans of baseball themselves so it made sense to have the boys hate baseball. The choice to go ahead with a baseball-themed episode did create some problems animation-wise, however, as most of the children look nearly identical wearing the same uniforms. A lot of time was spent on ensuring that each character was distinguishable from each other. For example, Butters Stotch and Stan Marsh look identical with the same attire. To rectify this, Stan's hair is more prominent than Butters' and Butters has a speaking line early. Additionally, Kenny appears with his hat slightly covering his face, making this one of Kenny's most visible episodes. The episode's plot was originally going to be used in  Best Friends Forever  but was put on hold when they came up with an episode based on the Terri Schiavo case instead.

According to the DVD commentary, "this was a really, really hard episode to do" because sports episodes in general aren't easy but also because the teams are trying to lose. Because they are trying to lose on purpose, new rules are needed which makes it different from any actual sport. The character of Bat Dad made it easier for Parker and Stone, however, as if it got too difficult, they could cut to Bat Dad.

References

External links
 "The Losing Edge" Full episode at South Park Studios
 

South Park (season 9) episodes
Baseball animation
Colorado Rockies